Scopula silonaria is a moth of the  family Geometridae. It is found in the Democratic Republic of Congo, Ethiopia, Kenya, Tanzania and Uganda.

References

Moths described in 1858
silonaria
Moths of Africa